Jean-Pierre Bemba Gombo (born 4 November 1962) is a politician in the Democratic Republic of the Congo. He was one of four vice-presidents in the transitional government of the Democratic Republic of the Congo from 17 July 2003 to December 2006. He led the Movement for the Liberation of the Congo (MLC), a rebel group turned political party. He received the second-highest number of votes in the 2006 presidential election. In January 2007 he was elected to the Senate. In 2008, during a trip to Europe, Bemba was arrested on International Criminal Court (ICC) charges of crimes against humanity and war crimes. He spent the following 10 years in prison at The Hague, The Netherlands; 8 years awaiting trial and verdict, then 2 more years after conviction in 2016. In 2018, the verdicts were overtuned on appeal. The court ruled that because the Rome Statute which sets the court's rules do not limit the amount of time a person can spend in prison awaiting trial, Bemba was not entitled to compensation. It called on member states to review urgently the relevant provisions in the statute No such review has yet taken place. In 2018, Bemba returned to the DRC where he has since been active in national politics.

Background
Bemba was born in Bokada, Nord-Ubangi.  His father, Jeannot Bemba Saolona, was a businessman who was successful under Zairian President Mobutu Sese Seko, and one of his sisters is married to Mobutu's son Nzanga, who was also a candidate in the 2006 presidential election.

Bemba attended boarding school in Brussels and later studied economics at the ICHEC Brussels Management School.

MLC in Équateur
The MLC movement started in the Orientale Province of the DRC in 1998 at the beginning of the Second Congo War. Said Bemba of its founding: "I had identified the possibility of launching an armed movement. So I went looking for serious partners. There were two countries in the region that were interested but I chose to present my dossier to the Ugandans. They liked it and so I went in."  Over time, the movement spread into the Équateur province, and established a permanent base in Gbadolite. Like many of the rebel groups at the time, the MLC's goal was to take the capital of Kinshasa.

This region had been decimated by war and the population was living in great poverty. Équateur was under an embargo: healthcare programs, education, and any kind of social assistance had been abandoned. The population was under constant threat of bombing by government forces, and had stopped producing goods or food. The popularity of Bemba and the MLC was such that over a thousand child soldiers joined up with MLC.

When the MLC troops arrived in Gbadolite, they secured the area and protected the population. Health centres and hospitals re-opened with the MLC securing safe passage for medicine and other supplies. The MLC worked with NGOs and the UN to reopen schools, restart agriculture, economic activity and exportation of goods. The population was able to sell coffee, corn and soya and build businesses.

Involvement in the Central African Republic
In 2002, President Ange-Félix Patassé of the Central African Republic invited the MLC to come to his country and put down a coup attempt. Human rights activists accused MLC fighters of committing atrocities against civilians in the course of this conflict.

Vice president
In 2003 Bemba became vice-president under a peace deal.

2006 Presidential election

Bemba was one of 33 candidates who ran in the Congolese presidential election on 30 July 2006. His main campaign slogan — "One Hundred Percent Congolese" — was widely perceived as an attack on frontrunner President Joseph Kabila.

Bemba received substantial support in the western, Lingala-speaking portion of the country, including the capital, Kinshasa. Following the vote there was significant tension as to whether  Kabila would win a majority of the vote, avoiding a runoff against Bemba, who was perceived as Kabila's main opponent. However, results announced on 20 August gave Kabila 44% of the vote and Bemba 20%,

On 21 August 2006, while accompanied by 14 ambassadors of CIAT members (International Committee in charge of the Transition), including ambassadors from the United States of America, The UK, France (Bernard Prévost) and Belgium, and from MONUC, US diplomat William L. Swing, Bemba survived an assassination attempt by the Presidential Guard bombing his residence in Gombe. The ambassadors were forced to seek refuge in a cellar.
Kabila and Bemba faced each other in a second round, held on 29 October. The electoral commission announced the official results on 15 November, naming Kabila the winner with 58.05% of the vote; Bemba's supporters alleged fraud.

On 27 November 2006, the Supreme Court of the DRC rejected the fraud charges brought by Bemba, and confirmed Kabila as the new elected Congolese President. A day later, Bemba said that he disagreed with the court's decision, but that "in the greater national interest and to preserve peace and to save the country from chaos and violence", he would participate in the system by leading the political opposition. He did not attend Kabila's swearing-in ceremony on 6 December. On 8 December, the MLC announced that Bemba would run for a Senate seat from Kinshasa in the January 2007 senatorial election, and he succeeded in winning a seat.

March 2007 violence
A further attempt on Bemba's life in March 2007 led to an outbreak of fighting near Bemba's residence. 
A number of soldiers and civilians were reported killed. Bemba called for a ceasefire and negotiations and took refuge in the South African embassy. As fighting continued on 23 March, it was announced that a warrant for Bemba's arrest had been issued, accusing him of high treason. Although Bemba enjoyed immunity as a senator, the country's chief prosecutor said that he would ask parliament to remove it.

On 26 March, Kabila said that security could not be guaranteed through negotiation and referred to the importance of restoring order. Bemba warned of a potential for dictatorship and foreshadowed his retreat into exile, citing security concerns.

Late in the month it was reported that Bemba planned to travel to Portugal for treatment of a broken leg; he had already received treatment for his leg there in previous months. The Portuguese ambassador subsequently said on 30 March that Bemba was expected to go to Portugal for treatment, but was not going into exile there. On 9 April, the Senate approved the trip, for a period of 60 days. On 11 April, Bemba left the South African embassy and was taken to the airport by U.N. MONUC forces, then flown out of the country to Portugal, along with his wife and children. On 12 April, the attorney general, Tshimanga Mukeba, said that he had asked the Senate to remove Bemba's immunity.

Following the outbreak of violence in March, Bemba's party, the MLC, said that it was being targeted by the government through arrests and intimidation, and that its headquarters was occupied by government forces. On 13 April, the party suspended its participation in the National Assembly due to this intimidation and insecurity.

In the first half of June, it was reported that, despite the expiration of the 60 days prescribed by the Senate, Bemba would not return to the DRC due to safety concerns. According to MLC executive secretary , Bemba was medically able to return and take part in politics again, and Luhaka called for a political solution to facilitate his return. Without Senate permission to be absent, he would automatically lose his seat if absent from over a quarter of Senate sessions, unless the absences were justified. On 15 June, the Senate extended Bemba's permitted absence until 31 July, following a request from Bemba in a 12 June letter in asking for more time. In this letter he expressed a readiness to return and take part in politics, but also expressed concerns about his safety.

On 13 July, Bemba met with Louis Michel, the European Commissioner for Development & Humanitarian Aid. According to Michel, Bemba "intends to give the presidential majority the benefit of the doubt" and would not do or say anything "that could be taken as an attempt at destabilisation". He did not return by the deadline on 31 July, with a spokesman citing continued security concerns; the Senate was then in recess until 15 September, and Senate President Kengo wa Dondo said that Bemba would not be penalized for being away during this period because the Senate was not in session. In a statement published on 1 August, Bemba said that he wanted to return before 15 September.

It was announced on 7 September that Bemba had met with National Assembly President Vital Kamerhe in Portugal to discuss his potential return. In November 2007, he visited Belgium and met with Belgian Foreign Minister Karel De Gucht on 5 November.

In a March 2008 interview, Bemba said that he was in "forced exile" and that it seemed the government was moving towards a dictatorship.

Arrest and trial

On 24 May 2008, Bemba was arrested near Brussels. He was handed over to the ICC on 3 July 2008 and transferred to its detention centre in the Hague.  He was the only person arrested in connection with the ICC's investigation in the Central African Republic. The Supreme Court of the Central African Republic found no basis to pursue cases against Bemba and former CAR President Ange-Félix Patassé.

The trial of Bemba began on 22 November 2010 and lasted four years. The prosecutor was Fatou Bensouda. Two more years passed before the verdict was given.

On 21 March 2016, he was convicted on two counts of crimes against humanity and three counts of war crimes. This marked the first time the International Criminal Court (ICC) convicted someone of sexual violence. The trial evaluated a theory of criminal responsibility related to whether a remote commander who failed to prevent or punish crimes was liable for crimes against humanity and war crimes.

On 21 June 2016, the ICC sentenced Bemba to 18 years in prison for war crimes and crimes against humanity committed by his Congolese Liberation Movement (MLC). In March 2017 he was sentenced to an extra year in prison and fined 300,000 euros ($324,000) by the ICC for interfering with witnesses in his trial.

On 28 September 2016, Bemba served the ICC appeals chamber with an appeal against his 18-year conviction citing numerous procedural and legal errors in the judgment, and alleging a mistrial. The appeal centered on whether Bemba had a fair trial, with concerns about the need for greater specificity in criminal charges. The conviction was overturned on 8 June 2018
by Judge Christine Van den Wyngaert. She said he cannot be held responsible for the actions of his men, and that the lower court "ignored significant testimonial evidence that Bemba's ability to investigate and punish crimes in the CAR was limited". The court ruled that because the Rome Statute which sets the court's rules do not limit the amount of time a person can spend in prison awaiting trial, Bemba was not entitled to compensation. It called on member states to review urgently the relevant provisions in the statute No such review has yet taken place.

On 4 May 2017 Bemba had also filed an appeal against his conviction for interfering with witnesses, alleging factual and legal errors on the part of the trial chamber and illegal investigative activity by the ICC Office of the Prosecutor.

2018 to present

On 1 August 2018, Bemba returned to the DRC after 11 years of exile and imprisonment. He was barred from running after a review conducted by the country's Independent National Electoral Commission. He joined other opposition leaders to support candidate Martin Fayulu, who went on win the election by a wide marging according to many sources, but to  lose, according to the official election commission, to  Félix Tshisekedi. As of 2023, Bemba was active in national DRC politics.

Notes and references

Further reading 
O’Sullivan, Carmel (2022). "New court, same division: The Bemba case as an illustration of the continued confusion regarding the command responsibility doctrine". Leiden Journal of International Law.

External links

ICC Website for Jean-Pierre Bemba
Al Jazeera interview with Bemba, 3 August 2007.

1962 births
Living people
People from Nord-Ubangi
Vice-presidents of the Democratic Republic of the Congo
Movement for the Liberation of the Congo politicians
21st-century criminals
Candidates for President of the Democratic Republic of the Congo
People extradited from Belgium
Democratic Republic of the Congo people imprisoned abroad
People convicted by the International Criminal Court
Democratic Republic of the Congo politicians convicted of crimes
Heads of government who were later imprisoned
People acquitted by the International Criminal Court
21st-century Democratic Republic of the Congo people